David Lloyd George, 2nd Viscount Tenby (4 November 1922 – 4 July 1983) was a Welsh peer, a grandson of the first David Lloyd George, British prime minister.

Lloyd George was the elder son of Gwilym Lloyd George, 1st Viscount Tenby, and Edna Gwenfrom Jones. He was educated at Eastbourne College, then was commissioned into the Royal Artillery during the Second World War, rising to the rank of Captain. After the war, he continued his education at Jesus College, Cambridge, and graduated BA in 1947, proceeding to MA in 1949.

On 14 February 1967, Lloyd George succeeded his father as Viscount Tenby and took his seat in the House of Lords. He died unmarried in 1983 and was succeeded by his younger brother, William Lloyd George.

References

External links
Viscount Tenby, Cracroft's Peerage

1922 births
People educated at Eastbourne College
Alumni of Jesus College, Cambridge
Royal Artillery officers
Viscounts in the Peerage of the United Kingdom
Crossbench hereditary peers
David 2
1983 deaths
British Army personnel of World War II